Sharon Raye Brown (born 1962) is an American lawyer and politician of the Republican Party. She is a member of the Washington State Senate from Washington's 8th Legislative District. Brown was appointed to fill the Senate seat on February 4, 2013 following Senator Jerome Delvin's leaving to become Benton County Commissioner in January 2013.

Awards 
 2014 Guardians of Small Business award. Presented by NFIB.
 2020 Guardians of Small Business. Presented by NFIB.
 2021 City Champion Awards. Presented by Association of Washington Cities (AWC).

Personal life 
Brown's husband is Fraser. They have five children. Brown and her family live in Kennewick, Washington.

Election history

References

External links 

1962 births
Living people
21st-century American politicians
21st-century American women politicians
Republican Party Washington (state) state senators
Women state legislators in Washington (state)